Eupithecia rulena is a moth in the family Geometridae. It is found in Nepal.

The wingspan is about 16.5–18 mm. The forewings are rusty brown and the hindwings are pale ochreous.

References

Moths described in 2010
rulena
Moths of Asia